Pseudoalteromonas carrageenovora is a marine bacterium. It belongs to the Gammaproteobacter. The cells are rod-shaped.

References

External links

Type strain of Pseudoalteromonas carrageenovora at BacDive -  the Bacterial Diversity Metadatabase

Alteromonadales
Bacteria described in 1995